Kati language may refer to:

Muyu language, an Ok language of West Papua
Kata-vari dialect, spoken by the Kata in parts of Afghanistan and Pakistan